is a small offshore island, about  in circumference, at the mouth of the Katase River which flows into the Sagami Bay of Kanagawa Prefecture, Japan. Administratively, Enoshima is part of the mainland city of Fujisawa, and is linked to the Katase section of that city by a  bridge. Home to some of the closest sandy beaches to Tokyo and Yokohama, the island and adjacent coastline are the hub of a local resort area.

History

Classical era
Benzaiten, the goddess of music and entertainment, is enshrined on the island. The island in its entirety is dedicated to the goddess, who is said to have caused it to rise from the bottom of the sea in the sixth century. The island is the scene of the Enoshima Engi, a history of shrines on Enoshima written by the Japanese Buddhist monk Kōkei in 1047 AD.

Modern era
In 1880, after the Shinto and Buddhism separation order of the new Meiji government had made the land available, much of the uplands was purchased by Samuel Cocking, a British merchant, in his Japanese wife's name. He developed a power plant and extensive botanical gardens including a very large greenhouse. Although the original greenhouse was destroyed in the 1923 Great Kantō earthquake, the botanical garden (now the Samuel Cocking Garden) remains an attraction with over half a million visitors a year.

Contemporary era
Enoshima is now the center of Shōnan, a resort area along the coast of Sagami Bay.

Transportation
Enoshima is served by three nearby railway stations: Katase-Enoshima Terminus on the Odakyū Enoshima Line, Enoshima Station on the Enoshima Electric Railway ("Enoden"), and Shōnan-Enoshima Station on the Shonan Monorail.

Features 
Enoshima Shrine
Iwaya Caves - were formed by the erosion of waves in ancient times. It has also been a place for Buddhist monks to train. The Iwaya caves consists of the First Cave ( in length) and the Second Cave ( in length). These caves can be entered by purchasing a ticket.
Samuel Cocking Garden- located at the island's summit.
Enoshima Sea Candle- located within the Samuel Cocking Garden.
Luminous Way - A set of three illuminated escalators which take visitors from the base of the Enoshima Shrine to the Samuel Cocking Garden, bypassing a series of long and steep stairways. Fees required.
Enoshima Illuminations - A large-scale light show that runs from December through the end of February. The show is free, but admission to the Samuel Cocking Garden is required.
Lover's Hill/Bell of Ryuren - A romantic place where lovers post messages with padlocks, a mini-version of the love locks in Paris. 
Enoshima Aquarium - See the exhibits of a large variety of sea creatures as well as live shows involving dolphins and penguins. Admission fees required.

Sport
Enoshima was the Olympic harbor for the 1964 Summer Olympics. Enoshima was also used as the sailing venue for the 2020 Summer Olympics.

Accessibility 
While the bridge and town area of Enoshima are wheelchair accessible, anything past the main gate of the shrine (including the observation tower, caves, etc.) is inaccessible to those with mobility difficulties.

In popular culture
 In the 1951 film Tokyo File 212, a key scene takes place in Enoshima.
 In the 2004 anime Uta Kata, the main character and her friends visit Enoshima in one episode.
 In the 2004 anime Elfen Lied, Enoshima and the Enoshima Sea Candle are the location for the battle with Mariko.
 In the 2012 anime Tsuritama, Enoshima is the main location.  
 In the 2015 anime Himouto! Umaru-chan, the characters visit Enoshima in the penultimate episode of the first season. 
 In the 2018 anime Rascal Does Not Dream of Bunny Girl Senpai, the island is featured in episode 6. Characters live in nearby Fujisawa. 
 In the 2022 anime Bocchi the Rock!, the main protagonists visit the island in episode 9.
 In the video game series Danganronpa, the main antagonist is named Junko Enoshima.

Notes

References 
 Johnson, H. (2022). 'Enoshima: Signifying Island Heritage Across Space and Place'. Okinawan Journal of Island Studies 3 (1): 3–20.
 Papinot, E. (1910). Historical and Geographical Dictionary of Japan. 1972 printing. Tokyo: Charles E. Tuttle Company. .

External links

  Fujisawa City Tourism

Venues of the 1964 Summer Olympics
Venues of the 2020 Summer Olympics
Olympic sailing venues
Olympic surfing venues
Fujisawa, Kanagawa
Islands of Kanagawa Prefecture
Shoals of Japan